Jimmy's Hall is a 2014 drama film directed by Ken Loach. The film tells the story of the deportation to the United States in 1933 of Irish Communist Jimmy Gralton, who led the Revolutionary Workers' Group, a precursor of the Communist Party of Ireland, in Leitrim.  It stars Irish actor Barry Ward, along with Simone Kirby, Jim Norton and Denise Gough. The title refers to a rural dance hall built by Gralton in his home town Effrinagh.

It was selected to compete for the Palme d'Or in the main competition section at the 2014 Cannes Film Festival.

Plot
In 1932, after ten years of living in the United States, Jimmy Gralton returns to his home in native Ireland to help his mother run the family farm.

A new government is in power ten years after the end of the Irish Civil War, an act which leads to Jimmy reestablishing a community centre for young people to dance, study or talk, drawing on his experience with jazz music during his time in the US. The hall becomes popular, which arouses opposition in the town, particularly the Church in the form of Father Sheridan, who denounces the music and dancing at the hall as lewd and licentious.

Jimmy and his mother, with whom he is living and who is also sympathetic to Communism, attempt to prevent an eviction of a family who are displaced from their home. Jimmy's activism brings him to the attention of the Gardaí. This starts a chain of events which ends in Jimmy's deportation from Ireland for sedition. As he holds an American passport, he is exiled back to States. During a rally protesting his expulsion, Jimmy's mother decries the lack of a fair trial.

Critical response

Jimmy's Hall garnered generally positive critical reception. Review aggregation website Rotten Tomatoes gives the film a score of 76% from 104 reviews. The site's consensus states "Benefiting from a talented cast and sensitive work from director Ken Loach, Jimmy's Hall offers period drama rich with relevant sociopolitical themes." Metacritic, gave the film a weighted average score of 63 out of 100, based on reviews from 24 critics, indicating "generally favorable reviews".

Scott Foundas of Variety called it "A minor-key but eminently enjoyable work by a master craftsman."

Musical

In 2017, Dublin′s Abbey Theatre presented a musical adaptation of the film. It returned to the Abbey in 2018 and toured nationwide.

References

External links
 
 'Mike Leigh and Ken Loach films selected for Cannes' (BBC website)
 Article from Irish Times

2014 films
English-language French films
English-language Irish films
2010s historical drama films
British historical drama films
Irish drama films
French historical drama films
Films directed by Ken Loach
Films scored by George Fenton
Films set in 1932
Films set in 1933
2014 drama films
Sony Pictures Classics films
2010s English-language films
2010s British films
2010s French films